is the German word for a rifle. Prior to the 1840s, rifled guns were not widespread, usually muzzle-loading and termed , as they are still in German hunting jargon today. Afterwards,  became the standard term for military-type rifles.

The term "Gewehr" can be encountered in the context of 19th and 20th century military history for nonspecific rifles from German-speaking countries, e.g. in arms trade, in particular for types produced before German unification in 1871.

Specific types, sorted chronologically from 1841 to 1997 and with designer given, are:
 Gewehr 41 (Dreyse, 1841)
 Gewehr 71 (Mauser, 1871)
 Gewehr 88 (state committee, 1888)
 Gewehr 98 (Mauser, 1898)
 T-Gewehr (Mauser, 1918)
 Gewehr 41 (Walther, 1941)
 Gewehr 43 (Walther, 1943)
 Sturmgewehr 44 (CITEFA/Schmeisser, 1944)
 Gewehr 36 (Heckler & Koch, 1997)

See also
 German military rifles

Rifles